Pseudopaludicola canga is a species of frog in the family Leptodactylidae.
It is endemic to Brazil.
Its natural habitats are subtropical or tropical seasonally wet or flooded lowland grassland, freshwater marshes, and intermittent freshwater marshes.

References

Pseudopaludicola
Endemic fauna of Brazil
Taxonomy articles created by Polbot
Amphibians described in 2003